Cyrus Livingston Dunham (January 16, 1817 – November 21, 1877) was an attorney, soldier, and prominent Indiana politician, serving most notably as a U.S. Representative from Indiana from 1849 to 1855.

Biography
Born in Dryden, New York in 1817, Dunham attended public schools, and eventually taught school. After earning a law degree and being admitted to the Bar, he moved to Salem, Indiana in 1841 and began practicing law. Dunham was elected prosecuting attorney of Washington County, Indiana in 1845 and then served as a member of the Indiana State House of Representatives for one term from 1846 to 1847.

Dunham then successfully ran for Congress, being elected to the Thirty-first, Thirty-second, and Thirty-third Congresses (March 4, 1849 – March 3, 1855) as a Democrat. He served as Chairman of the Committee on Roads and Canals during the Thirty-third Congress. After his time in Congress, he was appointed by Governor Ashbel P. Willard as Secretary of State of Indiana, serving from 1859 to 1860.

During the American Civil War, Dunham served in the Union Army as Colonel of the 50th Indiana Infantry Regiment. He was commissioned on December 1, 1861 and honorably discharged on November 4, 1863.

Dunham was again elected as a member of the Indiana State House of Representatives for another term from 1864 to 1865. He married Malvina B. Markwell on January 6, 1870. He also lived in Jeffersonville, Indiana while serving as Judge of Clark County, Indiana Criminal Court from 1871 to 1874.

Work as an attorney
As an attorney Cyrus Livingston Dunham defended some of the notorious Reno Gang members in Brownstown, Indiana. In addition, he was rumored to have shipped the skulls of two other criminals hung by vigilantes in the same town to New York City.

From an article in The New York Times article:
Louisville (Kentucky), Tuesday, May 27, 1862:

Col. C.L. DUNHAM, of the Fiftieth Indiana, at Bowling Green, is suspected and criticised by Unionists of Warren, members of his regiment, and the Bedford (Ind.) Press. He is charged with disloyal sympathies, squinting at treason, neglecting his duty, giving up to "pleasurable indulgences," abusing and insulting his men. If he can exculpate himself, well. If not, he'll be cashiered.

References

 The New York Times Article 1862
 American Civil War Soldiers Database, Provo, Utah, USA
 W.P.A. Book 6, page 557, Marriages in Floyd County, Indiana
 Anarchy in the Heartland, 2008, by A. David Distler, page 66
  Retrieved on 2009-04-07

External links

The Battle at Parker's Crossroads, Tennessee Cyrus L Dunham commanding Union Forces.

1817 births
1877 deaths
Secretaries of State of Indiana
People of Indiana in the American Civil War
Union Army colonels
Democratic Party members of the United States House of Representatives from Indiana
People from Dryden, New York
19th-century American politicians